The 2010 Volkswagen Scirocco R-Cup was the first Volkswagen Scirocco R-Cup season, the replacement for the ADAC Volkswagen Polo Cup. It began on April 24 at the Hockenheimring and ended again at the Hockenheimring on October 16, after seven race weekends and a total of nine races.

Drivers
 All cars are powered by Volkswagen engines and use Volkswagen Scirocco chassis.

Race calendar and results

Championship standings

 No points are awarded for pole position or fastest race laps. Half-points of the values listed above are awarded for the first two races of the season.

References

External links
Official website

Volkswagen Scirocco R-Cup
Volkswagen Scirocco R-Cup seasons